"Hey God" is a song from American rock band Bon Jovi's sixth studio album, These Days (1995), released as the album's fifth and final single on June 24, 1996. Although it did not chart in the United States, it became a moderate hit in Canada, Finland, Iceland, the Netherlands and the United Kingdom.

Background
As with most of the songs on These Days, "Hey God" is one of Bon Jovi's darker songs. It brings together different stories of people living on the edge of breakdown and despair, such as a father who claims his family are "two paychecks away from living out on the street", a single mother with a wayward son who has been convicted of killing a police officer, and a young man growing up in the ghetto. Throughout the course of the song, each of these characters cries out for spiritual help.

Richie Sambora said that inspiration for the song came when he was sitting in his limo and made eye contact with a derelict huddling in a cardboard box on the pavement. Sambora's sense of guilt at this was immense and after discussing the incident with Jon Bon Jovi, they wrote "Hey God".

Chart performance
The song charted at number 13 on the UK Singles Chart and number 44 on Canada's RPM 100 Hit Tracks chart.

Live performances
"Hey God", like most of the songs from the album, is rarely played live by the band. A performance of the song can be seen as part of the encore from the Live From London DVD. In 2008, the song made a comeback in some of the band's concerts during their Lost Highway Tour.

Track listings

UK CD1
 "Hey God" (edit) – 4:47
 "The End" – 3:39
 "When She Comes" – 3:29
 "Hey God" (live from South Africa) – 7:17

UK CD2
 "Hey God" (edit) – 4:47
 "House of the Rising Sun" (live) – 4:00
 "Livin' on a Prayer" – 4:12

UK cassette single
 "Hey God" (edit) – 4:47
 "Lie to Me" (remix) – 4:40

European CD single
 "Hey God" (edit) – 4:47
 "These Days" (live) – 5:57

European maxi-CD single
 "Hey God" (edit) – 4:47
 "When She Comes" – 3:29
 "The End" – 3:39
 "These Days" (live) – 5:57

Japanese CD1
 "Hey God" (LP version) – 6:10
 "Fields of Fire" (demo) – 4:10
 "Mrs. Robinson" (live) – 3:21
 "I Thank You" – 3:14
 "Let's Make It Baby" (demo) – 6:19

Japanese CD2
 "Hey God" (edit) – 4:47
 "Crazy" (live) – 3:29
 "Tumblin' Dice" (live) – 4:17
 "Heaven Help Us" (live) – 4:34

Charts

References

Bon Jovi songs
1995 songs
1996 singles
Mercury Records singles
Song recordings produced by Peter Collins (record producer)
Songs written by Jon Bon Jovi
Songs written by Richie Sambora